Middlebrook is an unincorporated community within the borough of Bound Brook in Somerset County, New Jersey. It is named after the Middle Brook, a tributary of the Raritan River, on the western side of the community. The early-18th-century Old York Road, connecting Philadelphia to New York City, passed through here.

History
On May 4, 1681, a group of investors purchased from two Raritans, Konackama and Queromak, land bounded by the Raritan River, the Bound Brook, and the Middle Brook to the mountains for one hundred pounds, paid in goods. On September 25, 1683, Thomas Codrington, one of the original group, was apportioned 877 acres of this tract and built a house here, which he called Rackawackhana.

After the Battle of Bound Brook on April 13, 1777, General George Washington moved the Continental Army from its winter encampment at Morristown to the Middle Brook valley between the First and Second Watchung Mountains, now called Washington Valley, protected by positions on the Middlebrook Heights, the First Watchung ridge north of Middlebrook. This first Middlebrook encampment lasted from May 28 to July 2, 1777.

Historic houses
The Harris Tavern, built 1700 at the intersection of West Main Street and Vosseller Avenue, was the first hotel in Bound Brook. During the American Revolutionary War, it was known as the Middlebrook Hotel and was a favorite of army officers. Later it was known as the Fisher Hotel. The building has since been demolished.

The Thomas Codrington house, built 1683 at the intersection of High Street and LaMonte Avenue, was the first house built in Somerset County.

Notable people
People who were born in, residents of, or otherwise closely associated with Middlebrook include:
 Tunis Campbell (1812–1891), successful black politician in the Reconstruction era

Gallery

References

Bibliography
 
 

Bound Brook, New Jersey
Unincorporated communities in Somerset County, New Jersey
Unincorporated communities in New Jersey